is the latest greatest hits album by Masami Okui, released on 6 February 2008. Ooku includes seven singles that she produced under her own record label company evolution along with three self-cover version of older songs.

Track listing
Olive
Lyrics, composition: Masami Okui
Arrangement: Hideyuki Daichi Suzuki
Commercial song for Iromelo Mix
TRUST
Lyrics, composition: Masami Okui
Arrangement: Seikou Nagaoka
Opening song for anime television series He Is My Master

Lyrics, composition: Masami Okui
Arrangement: Monta
Theme song for DVD Drama Ray
zero -G-
Lyrics: Masami Okui
Composition: Monta
Arrangement: Hideyuki Daichi Suzuki
Opening song for anime television series Ray the Animation
Wild Spice
Lyrics: Masami Okui
Composition, arrangement: Monta
Opening song for anime television series Muteki Kanban Musume
Remote Viewing
Lyrics: Masami Okui
Composition: Michio Kinugasa
Arrangement: Hideyuki Daichi Suzuki
Opening song for PC game Routes PE and Routes Portable
It's my life
Lyrics: Masami Okui
Composition: Monta
Arrangement: Toshiro Yabuki, Tsutomu Ohira
Commercial song for Iromelo Mix
Reincarnation (self-cover version)
Lyrics: Satomi Arimori
Composition: Takashi Kudou
Arrangement: Toshiro Yabuki
Opening song for OVA Tekkaman Blade II
 (self-cover version)
Lyrics: Masami Okui
Composition, arrangement: Toshiro Yabuki
Opening song for anime television series Revolutionary Girl Utena
Shuffle (self-cover version)
Lyrics: Masami Okui
Composition, arrangement: Toshiro Yabuki
Opening song for anime television series Yugi-oh! Duel Monsters

DVD
Seven promo videos:
Olive
Trust

zero -G-
Wild Spice
It's my life
-w-

Sources
Official website: Makusonia

Masami Okui albums
2008 compilation albums
2008 video albums
Music video compilation albums